Liberatum is an international cultural diplomacy organisation, multimedia and cultural content  company founded by Pablo Ganguli in 2001. It creates and presents multidisciplinary artistic platforms  and promotes contemporary arts, film, media, literature and culture worldwide through its own festivals, films, summits and other programming. Liberatum champions human rights, freedom of expression and women in creativity through its platforms across the world.

History
Liberatum was founded by Pablo Ganguli in 2001 while he was living in Port Moresby, Papua New Guinea.

Global programme
Liberatum festivals, shows,<ref>[https://www.forbes.com/sites/abinlot/2014/06/30/see-kimye-lindsay-lohan-and-damien-hirst-in-tagged/#4e0605255a57 'See Kimye, Lindsay Lohan And Damien Hirst In 'Tagged], 'Forbes', 30 June 2014</ref> content, programmes and summits are hosted in worldwide. They have taken place in Russia, Turkey, Papua New Guinea, Germany, Hong Kong, Italy, United Kingdom, France, United States, India, Morocco. The festivals encourage new and established artists to perform, discuss and promote their work in front of  audiences so that they can debate and interact with their work. The artists are generally from different fields. Liberatum merged the worlds of art, fashion, music, both classical and contemporary encouraging them to collaborate.

Notable figures who have attended and taken part in Liberatum events include Peter Donohoe, Stephen Frears, Sir Norman Rosenthal, Charles Saumarez Smith, Shekhar Kapur, Valery Gergiev, Thomas Ades, Tilda Swinton, Pharrell Williams, Kirsten Dunst, Michael Nyman, Michael Stipe, Philip Treacy, Sir VS Naipaul, Zaha Hadid, Daphne Guinness, Wole Soyinka, Richard Branson, Annie Lennox, Clare Short, Shabana Azmi, Marianne Faithfull, Shashi Tharoor, Courtney Love, Gore Vidal and Goldie Hawn.

Film

Liberatum and illy  made a short film in 2014 called Inspiring Creativity featuring James Franco, Hans Zimmer, Tracey Emin, Joan Smalls about what drives their creativity. They have also made a film with W Hotels about transformation, including the performance artist Dita Von Teese; it was directed by Pablo Ganguli and Tomas Auksas.

Liberatum's other film 'Artistry/Technology' is a documentary on the relationship between creativity and technological advancement. David Hockney and Francis Ford Coppola agreed to be in the film.'Watch M.I.A, David Hockney & Francis Ford Coppola Discuss How Technology Affects Artistry', 'Complex', 30 March 2015'Watch 'Artistry/Technology' a Documentary with MIA, Frank Gehry, Miranda July, and More', 'Vice', 28 March 2015'Artistry/Technology', 'Vogue Italia', April 2015

Liberatum made a feature-length documentary about the environment and climate change entitled In This Climate  featuring Sir David Attenborough, Mark Ruffalo, Noam Chomsky and Cher.

Style
Liberatum has presented a wide range of cultural diplomacy programmes  and festivals  around the world including multidisciplinary ventures in Turkey such as  "Istancool" and has developed similar ventures in Hong Kong, Marrakech, Moscow and Berlin consisting of merging several artforms and striking performance art elements. The New York Times'' described Liberatum as a "cultural festival known for its hip quotient."

References

External links
 

Cultural organisations based in the United Kingdom
Cultural festivals in the United Kingdom
Cultural festivals in the United States
2001 establishments in the United Kingdom
Film festivals established in 2011
Film festivals established in 2001
Film festivals in Hong Kong
Film festivals in New York (state)
Cultural events
Music conferences
Annual events in New York (state)